Margaret Norfolk  may refer to:

Margaret Howard, Duchess of Norfolk (1540 – 1564), née Margaret Audley
Margaret, Duchess of Norfolk (c. 1320 – 1399)